Haikou University of Economics, formerly known as the Haikou College of Economics and Vocational Technology, is a private university located in Hainan Province, China.

Campuses
Haikou Campus
The main campus is located near Guoxing Road, in the southern part of Haikou city.
Coordinates: 

Guilinyang Campus
A new campus has opened while still under construction. It is located in Guilinyang, a town in Longhua District, east of the Nandu River.
Coordinates:

Gallery
Guilinyang Campus:

See also
List of universities and colleges in Hainan
List of universities in China
Higher education in China

References

External links
 
 Haikou University of Economics Official Website

Universities and colleges in Hainan
Organizations based in Haikou